The year 1982 involved some significant events in television. Below is a list of television-related events in the United States.

Events

Programs
20/20 (1978–)
60 Minutes (1968–)
Alice (1976–1985)
All My Children (1970–2011)
American Bandstand (1952–1989)
Another World (1964–1999)
Archie Bunker's Place (1979–1983)
As the World Turns (1956–2010)
Battle of the Planets (1978–1985)
Benson (1979–1986)
Candid Camera (1948–2004)
Captain Kangaroo (1955–1984)
CHiPs (1977–1983)
Dallas (1978–1991)
Days of Our Lives (1965–)
Dean Martin Celebrity Roast (1974–1984)
Diff'rent Strokes (1978–1986)
Dynasty (1981–1989)
Entertainment Tonight (1981–)
Face the Nation (1954–)
Falcon Crest (1981–1990)
Family Feud (1976–1985, 1988–1995, 1999–)
Fantasy Island (1977–1984)
Fat Albert and the Cosby Kids (1972–1984)
General Hospital (1963–)
Gimme a Break! (1981–1987)
Good Morning America (1975–)
Guiding Light (1952–2009)
Hallmark Hall of Fame (1951–)
Happy Days (1974–1984)
Hart to Hart (1979–1984)
Hee Haw (1969–1992)
Hill Street Blues (1981–1987)
It's a Living (1980–1982, 1985–1989)
Knight Rider (1982–1986)
Knots Landing (1979–1993)
Laverne & Shirley (1976–1983)
Little House on the Prairie (1974–1983)
Magnum, P.I. (1980–1988)
M*A*S*H (1972–1983)
Masterpiece Theatre (1971–present)
Match Game (1962–1969, 1973–1984, 1990–1991, 1998–1999)
Meet the Press (1947–present)
Monday Night Football (1970–present)
Nightline (1980–)
One Day at a Time (1975–1984)
One Life to Live (1968–2012)
Quincy, M.E. (1976–1983)
Real People (1979–1984)
Ryan's Hope (1975–1989)
Saturday Night Live (1975–)
Schoolhouse Rock! (1973–1986)
SCTV Network 90 (1981–1983)
Search for Tomorrow (1951–1986)
Sesame Street (1969–present)
Simon & Simon (1981–1988)
Solid Gold (1980–1988)
Soul Train (1971–2006)
Spider-Man and His Amazing Friends (1981–1983)
T.J. Hooker (1982–1986)
Taxi (1978–1983)
That's Incredible! (1980–1984)
The Devlin Connection (1982)
The Dukes of Hazzard (1979–1985)
The Edge of Night (1956–1984)
The Facts of Life (1979–1988)
The Fall Guy (1981–1986)
The Jeffersons (1975–1985)
The Love Boat (1977–1986)
The P.T.L. Club (1976–1987)
The Price Is Right (1972–)
The Today Show (1952–)
The Tonight Show (1954–; 1962–1992 as The Tonight Show Starring Johnny Carson)
The Young and the Restless (1973–)
This Old House (1979–present)
Three's Company (1977–1984)
Too Close for Comfort (1980–1986)
Trapper John, M.D. (1979–1986)
Truth or Consequences (1950–1988)
Walt Disney (1981–1983)
Wheel of Fortune (1975–)

Debuting this year

Resuming this year

Ending this year

Changing networks

Made-for-TV movies and miniseries

Television stations

Sign-ons

Network affiliation changes

Sign-Offs

Births

Deaths

See also
 1982 in the United States
 List of American films of 1982

References

External links 
List of 1982 American television series at IMDb